Flatwoods is a term in forestry.

Flatwoods, Flat Woods or Flatwood may refer to:
Flatwood, a soil series with impaired drainage 
Flatwoods monster, an alleged unidentified extraterrestrial or cryptid

Geography
In the United States
Flatwood, Kentucky, an unincorporated community in Adair County
Flatwoods, Kentucky, a city within Greenup County
Flatwoods, Louisiana, an unincorporated community in Rapides Parish
Flatwoods, Missouri, an unincorporated community in Ripley County
Flatwood, Missouri, in Shannon County
Flatwoods, Ohio, a ghost town
Flat Woods, Tennessee, an unincorporated community in Perry County
Flatwoods, West Virginia, a town in Braxton County